Omaha's Henry Doorly Zoo and Aquarium is a zoo in Omaha, Nebraska. It is accredited by the Association of Zoos and Aquariums and a member of the World Association of Zoos and Aquariums. Its mission is conservation, research, recreation, and education. In August 2014, TripAdvisor rated it the "world's best zoo", ahead of the San Diego Zoo and Loro Parque, based on an algorithmic assimilation of millions of reviews for 275 major zoos worldwide.

The zoo is known for its leadership in animal conservation and research. Evolving from the public Riverview Park Zoo established in 1894, today the zoo includes several notable exhibits. "Kingdoms of the Night" is the world's largest nocturnal exhibit and indoor swamp, the "Lied Jungle" is one of the world's largest indoor rainforests, and the "Desert Dome" is one of the world's largest indoor deserts, as well as the largest glazed geodesic dome.

History

The zoo began in 1894 as Riverview Park Zoo. Four years later, it had over 120 animals. In 1952, the Omaha Zoological Society was created with aims to improve the zoo. In 1963, Margaret Hitchcock Doorly donated $750,000. She stipulated that the zoo be renamed in memory of her late husband, Henry Doorly, chairman of the World Publishing Company. Union Pacific helped the zoo lay down  of track in 1968 and the inaugural run of the Omaha Zoo Railroad was made on July 22, 1968.

The zoo has two rides that circumnavigate the property (tram and train): a carousel and the Skyfari, an aerial tram which opened in 2009 and takes visitors from the Butterfly and Insect Pavilion to the new lion viewing exhibit.

The zoo is adjacent to the former site of Rosenblatt Stadium. In 2011, the zoo began developing the land at the stadium to become the new parking area and visitor center, leaving a small memorial at the location of home plate. Rosenblatt was replaced by the Charles Schwab Field Omaha downtown.

Zoo timeline
 1894: Riverview Park opened.
 1898: The park had a varied animal population of over 200 animals.
 1920s : Gould Dietz donated cat cages.
 1930s : The WPA built cat and bear exhibits.
 1952: The Omaha Zoological Society was organized for the improvement and administration of the zoo.
 1963: Margaret Hitchcock Doorly donated $750,000 to the zoo with the stipulation that the zoo be named after her late husband, Henry Doorly.
 1965: The Omaha Zoological Society was reorganized as a nonprofit organization, and the first phase of the zoo, which included bear grottos, gorilla and orangutan buildings, and Ak-sar-ben Nature Kingdom, was dedicated.
 1968: The inaugural run of Omaha Zoo Railroad was in July, and the Eugene C. Eppley Pachyderm Hill opened in November on the old baseball diamond site.
 1972: The Ak-Sar-Ben waterfall was constructed; in August, the Owen Sea Lion Pavilion opened, complete with a new concession building, public restrooms, and a gazebo where an old public swimming pool was located.
 1973: Owen Swan Valley and the Primate Research Building were completed.
 1974: A new diet kitchen and educational classrooms were completed.
 1977: The Cat Complex was added.
 1979: The hospital and nursery opened.
 1981: The giraffe and hoofstock complex opened.
 1983: The Lee G. Simmons Free-flight Aviary was completed.
 1984: A  saltwater aquarium opened in what had been the museum.
 1985: The gorilla and orangutan buildings were completely renovated and named in honor of the Owen family; Richard Simmons cut the ribbon.
 1986: World-Herald Square was completed, and the First Tier Wolf Woods, maintenance building, and hay barn were relocated to the northeast.
 1987: The Mutual of Omaha Wild Kingdom Pavilion, the visitor services area US West Plaza, and a new main entrance were finished.
 1988: Construction began on the Lied Jungle, and the zoo was selected for the endangered black-footed ferret breeding program. The zoo's greenhouse was built near the maintenance shop.
 1989: Durham Family's Bear Canyon was added; Doorly's Pride (a heroic bronze sculpture of a pride of 12 lions) was installed in the entry plaza area, and the zoo received the AAZPA Bean Award for its long-term gaur propagation efforts. The black-footed ferret building was constructed.
 1990: Dairy World featuring a children's petting zoo, educational exhibits, and concession area, was added, and the world's first in vitro-fertilized tiger was born.
 1991: The Birthday House for children's birthday parties and education classes was finished; the world's first artificially inseminated tiger was born at the zoo.
 1992: The Lied Jungle opened on April 4, with the attached Durham's TreeTops Restaurant and Education Center. Simmons Plaza near the main entrance was completed.
 1993: The old aquarium was closed and construction of the new aquarium began. The zoo received two AAZPA awards: the Conservation Award for the black-footed ferret management program and the Significant Achievement Award for the Lied Jungle. The world's first artificially inseminated gaur calf was born.
 1994: The Union Pacific Engine House for the Omaha Zoo Railroad was added.
 1995: The Walter and Suzanne Scott Kingdoms of the Seas Aquarium was opened. The zoo had more than 1.6 million visitors, and land was acquired for an off-site breeding facility and drive-through park. Construction began on the IMAX 3D Theater, and the zoo participated in the propagation of the world's first in vitro gorilla birth (Timu was born at the Cincinnati Zoo).
 1996: The Bill and Berniece Grewcock Center for Conservation and Research was completed, and Timu, the world's first in vitro gorilla moved to Omaha's zoo.
 1997: The Lozier IMAX theater was finished.
 1998: The Garden of the Senses, the Lee G. Simmons Conservation Park and Wildlife Safari ( west at Nebraska's I-80 Exit 426 near Ashland), and a new diet kitchen were completed, and construction began on a new pathology laboratory and keepers lounge.
 1999: Sue's Carousel was added, construction began on the world's largest desert dome, and the zoo hosted a temporary Komodo dragon exhibit.
 2000: The new North Entrance Plaza was completed, featuring a new gift shop, warehouse, entrance plaza, and visitor gazebo. The zoo joined the Okapi Species Survival Program, allowed it to be one of 14 zoos in North America to display rare okapi; a traveling koala exhibit visited the zoo.
 2001: Cheetah Valley, and new bongo and tree kangaroo exhibits were constructed, and the zoo hosted a traveling white alligator exhibit.
 2002: Desert Dome was finished, and construction began on Hubbard Gorilla Valley.
 2003: Kingdoms of the Night, featuring various nocturnal habitats, opened beneath the Desert Dome.
 2004: Hubbard Gorilla Valley was opened, and a tower with two high-capacity elevators were added to take visitors from the main level of the zoo near the Desert Dome down 44 ft. to Hubbard Gorilla Valley.
 2005: The Hubbard Orangutan Forest opened in two phases in May and August; a giraffe feeding station opened in the spring; and construction began on an addition to the Grewcock Center for Conservation and Research.
 2006: A new Guest Services building and two additional gates at the main entrance were added; the Hubbard Research wing expansion to the Grewcock Center for Conservation and Research opened in July; and the Budgie Encounter was finished.
 2007: Mutual of Omaha's Wild Kingdom Pavilion was transformed into the Exploration Station, and construction on the Butterfly and Insect Pavilion began.
 2008: The Berniece Grewcock Butterfly and Insect Pavilion opened; and construction on a Madagascar exhibit began.
 2009: Skyfari, a chairlift connecting the Butterfly and Insect Pavilion to the old African rangeland exhibit area.
 2010: Expedition Madagascar opened.
 2012: Scott Aquarium reopened after renovations, Rosenblatt Stadium demolished by the zoo, and the zoo renamed Omaha's Henry Doorly Zoo and Aquarium.
 2013: A new gift shop opened, the IMAX facility was remodeled, and the Infield At The Zoo and Gateway to the Wild exhibits were completed.
 2014: Stingray Beach opened to the public. The seasonal interactive exhibit, located by Sue's Carousel, allows visitors to touch and feed cownose, Atlantic and Southern stingrays. Camel rides, also located by Sue's Carousel, opened to the public. Construction on Omaha's Henry Doorly Zoo and Aquarium's largest project, the African Grasslands, begins."
 2016: Six African elephants arrived at the zoo from Eswatini to escape a drought on March 11. On May 27, African Grasslands opened after two years of construction. This, coupled with Memorial Day weekend, caused what local media dubbed "Zoopocalypse". Within two hours of opening the zoo saw over 8,000 visitors enter the main gates; a normal Sunday sees 4–5,000 people all day. Hours later, the entrance count was up to over 20,000 people.
 2018: Bay Family Children's Adventure Trails opens.
 2020: Owen Sea Lion Shores Attraction opened on September 4.
 2021: Hubbard Gorilla Valley, Expedition: Madagascar and Hubbard Orangutan Forest underwent extensive renovations and reopened July 3.

Major exhibits

African Grasslands
After six years of planning and three years of construction, the 28-acre, $73 million African Grasslands exhibit opened to the public May 27, 2016, over the zoo's former eastern boundary area and Pachyderm Hill exhibits.

In 2017, Warren the African elephant unexpectedly died. He was the only male of the six African elephants that arrived at the zoo from Eswatini.
In May 2019, the Birmingham Zoo's male African bush elephant Callee joined the herd of five female elephants to breed with them. In January 2022, two baby elephants, Eugenia and Sonny, were born to two of the females, Kiki and Claire respectively. In March 2022, the zoo announced a third female was pregnant; Lolly would go on to give birth to a male calf in March 2023.

Species include:
 African bush elephant
 Reticulated giraffe
 Southern white rhinoceros
 Grant's zebra
 Ostrich
 Meerkat
 Klipspringer
 Rock hyrax
 White-throated monitor
 Crested guineafowl
 African pygmy goat
 Lion
 Cheetah
 Impala
 Lesser kudu
 Sable antelope
 Bongo
 Okapi
 Pink-backed pelican

Asian Highlands
A new exhibit built on previously undeveloped space, the Asian Highlands area is a $22 million, 8-acre recreation of the highlands of central Asia, including India and China, designed to simulate a mountain ascent, featuring species native to the region as well as a Yeti Camp, acting as a hub for visitors with themed food and gift options, and a Kid's Discovery Trail. The first phase of the exhibit opened in the spring of 2018 and the second phase opened in the spring of 2019. Species in the exhibit include:
 Indian rhinoceros
 Père David's deer
 Red panda
 White-naped crane
 Sichuan takin
 Chinese goral
 Chinese muntjac
 Tufted deer
 Sloth bear
 Snow leopard
 Siberian tiger

Butterfly and Insect Pavilion
The Berniece Grewcock Butterfly and Insect Pavilion opened in 2008. The Pavilion is a  total-immersion exhibit located between the Scott Aquarium and the Giraffe Complex. Viewed from the sky, the exhibit resembles a winged insect. The building features several exhibits:
 Butterfly Conservatory: The  area features -high glass sidewalls to allow the maximum amount of light inside the exhibit. Natural light, large trees, rocks, and water elements simulate a natural habitat and help stimulate natural butterfly behaviors.
 Conservation Promenade: Located in the Butterfly Conservatory, the promenade winds past waterfalls and over streams, through vegetation, and loops around the giant Amazon water lily pool. The pool features a stilt root tree supporting a floating walkway through the roots for a close view of the giant South American water lilies. Species of butterflies and moths include the blue morpho, zebra longwing, and painted ladies. Microhabitats are displayed along the Conservation Promenade featuring endangered amphibians the Zoo is currently working with in response to the global amphibian crisis. Visitors must stop in a mirrored room to check for butterflies before exiting.
 Chrysalis Hatching Room: A  area where butterflies and moths in their chrysalis or cocoon stage will be brought in from all over the world. Inside, they are carefully hung in hatching chambers where visitors can watch them complete their metamorphosis. The  entry hallway leading into the insect wing contains several displays, such as a locust colony and a Halloween moon crab, along with interactive learning opportunities.
Individual micro-habitats are home to ants, spiders, scorpions, walking sticks, mantids, centipedes, roaches, beetles and other animals. In the center of this room, two bird exhibits house other exotic species such as tropical hummingbirds.
Another  room is used to maintain plants that are being rotated through the butterfly display. A  frog breeding and rearing facility houses the most threatened amphibians. The rooms can be viewed through windows from the Giraffe Observation Walk that circles the building and allow Zoo visitors a look behind the scenes. This same path has numerous native butterfly gardens.

Desert Dome

The Desert Dome opened in April 2002 at a cost of $31.5 million (includes Kingdoms of the Night). It is one of the world's largest indoor deserts at around 42,000 ft2 (0.96 acres; 3,900 m2).
The Desert Dome has geologic features from deserts around the world: Namib Desert of southern Africa, Red Center of Australia, and the Sonoran Desert of the southwest United States.

Animals include:

 African wild cat
 Bat-eared fox
 Common dwarf mongoose
 Klipspringer
 Spotted thick-knee
 Cape cobra
 Inland taipan
 Rough-scaled death adder
 Lace monitor
 Perentie
 Bobcat
 Burrowing owl
 Collared peccary
 Gambel's quail
 Greater roadrunner
 Ocelot
 Swift fox
 Turkey vulture
 White-nosed coati
 Arizona black rattlesnake
 Santa Catalina rattlesnake
 Sidewinder
 Mexican beaded lizard
 Laughing kookaburra
 Tawny frogmouth
In addition to being one of the world's largest indoor deserts, the Desert Dome's geodesic dome is also the largest 'glazed' geodesic dome. The 1,760 acrylic windows with four shades (some clear) were placed to allow maximum shade in the summer and maximum light in the winter to reduce energy costs.

Expedition Madagascar
Expedition Madagascar opened May 7, 2010, and has many animals including lemurs, straw-coloured fruit bats, and giant jumping rats. The building allows visitors to learn about Madagascar, an area considered one of the top hotspots for biodiversity because it is home to the largest number of endemic plant and animal species. Each exhibit is linked to ongoing projects in Madagascar and conservation efforts that the zoo's Madagascar Biodiversity Partnership has been active in since 1998. It underwent extensive renovations in 2021 during a closure due to the COVID-19 pandemic, and reopened in July 2021. Animals in the exhibit include:
 Ring-tailed lemur
 Red ruffed lemur
 Black-and-white ruffed lemur
 Grey mouse lemur
 Mongoose lemur
 Aye-aye
 Collared lemur
 Common brown lemur
 Fossa
 Malagasy giant rat
 Radiated tortoise

Garden of the Senses

The Garden of the Senses opened in spring 1998 at a cost of $1.8 million.
The garden houses plants, fountains, birds, and a giant sundial.
There are over 250 species of herbs, perennials trees, roses and other flowers, butterfly-friendly plants, and trellises. The birds include macaws, South American parrots, and Australian cockatoos.

Hubbard Gorilla Valley
The Hubbard Gorilla Valley is a gorilla exhibit named after Dr. Theodore Hubbard, a cardiologist from Omaha. It opened on April 8, 2004, at a cost of $14 million. Prior to being expanded and rebuilt, the Hubbard Gorilla Valley was the Owen Gorilla House. It underwent extensive renovations in 2021, while the exhibit was closed due to the COVID-19 pandemic, and reopened in July 2021.

Some of the animals included are:
 Western lowland gorilla 
 Mantled guereza 
 Wolf's mona monkey 
 Diana monkey 
 Abyssinian ground hornbill 
 Yellow-backed duiker 
 Black crowned crane 
 Red River Hog
 Cattle egret

Hubbard Orangutan Forest
The Hubbard Orangutan Forest opened in two phases during 2005; the first phase was opened in May, and the second phase opened in late summer at a cost of $8.5 million. The first phase is the outdoor habitat that includes two -tall,  Banyan trees interconnected with vines enclosed by a stainless steel netting. It underwent extensive renovations in 2021, while the exhibit was closed due to the COVID-19 pandemic, and reopened in July 2021. A  waterfall is named after Claire Hubbard, the Orangutan Forest's primary donor. The second phase, the indoor habitat has 3,126 ft2 (0.07 acres; 290 m2) which, as of spring 2022, has been closed due to the COVID-19 pandemic.

Animals in the exhibit include:
 Bornean orangutan 
 François' langur
 Siamang

Suzanne and Walter Scott Aquarium

The Walter and Suzanne Scott Aquarium, a public aquarium, opened on April 1, 1995, at a cost of $16 million. The exhibit was first renovated in 2011, and opened again on April 5, 2012. It is one of the largest in-zoo aquariums in the world.

It features displays of aquatic habitats from polar regions, temperate oceans, the flooded Amazon rainforest, and coral reefs. The  shark tank features a  shark tunnel at the bottom of the -deep tank.
This tank features sharks, stingrays, sea turtles, and coral reef fish. An additional  is attached to the public portion and institutes a holding and quarantine tank. Other tanks include multiple species of jellyfish, a Giant pacific octopus and open-ocean schooling fish. Another addition is a touch tank which allows visitors to feel the textures of various starfish, shells, and possibly a chain catshark or one of its empty eggs. The only freshwater display is of the Amazon rainforest that includes fish, invertebrates, turtles, and a toucan.

The aquarium features aquatic animals from around the world, including:
 Atlantic puffin
 Tufted puffin
 Southern rockhopper penguin 
 King penguin 
 Gentoo penguin
 Porcupinefish
 Moray eel
 Sharks
 Stingray
 Green sea turtle
 Loggerhead sea turtle
 Jellyfish
 Giant Pacific octopus
 Red-bellied piranha
 Toco toucan
 Giant gourami
 Pacu
 Amazon catfish

Kingdoms of the Night

The Eugene T. Mahoney Kingdoms of the Night opened beneath the Desert Dome in April 2003 at a cost of $31.5 million (includes Desert Dome). Kingdoms of the Night is the world's largest nocturnal animal exhibit  at 42,000 ft2 (0.96 acres; 3,900 m2). The swamp is also the world's largest indoor swamp.
The Kingdoms of the Night logo is a sign that has owl eyes.

Some of the animals found at the Kingdom of the Night include:
 Fossa 
 Aardvark
 African brush-tailed porcupine
 Naked mole-rat
 Common vampire bat
 Egyptian fruit bat
 Seba's short-tailed bat
 Alligator snapping turtle
 American alligator, including a leucistic individual (one of less than 13 in the world)
 American crocodile
 North American beaver
 Freshwater crocodile
 Spectacled caiman
 Northern greater galago
 South African springhare
 Gray-handed night monkey
 Hoffmann's two-toed sloth
 Prehensile-tailed porcupine
 Nine-banded armadillo
 Southern three-banded armadillo
 Blind cave fish
 Short-beaked echidna
 Tammar wallaby

Lied Jungle

The Lied Jungle opened on April 4, 1992, at a cost of $15 million.
This exhibit allows visitors to look out from behind a -tall waterfall.

Inside are 123,000 ft2 (2.82 acres; 11,400 m2) of floor space, of which 61,000 ft2 (1.4 acres; 5,670 m2) are planted exhibit space; 35,000 ft2 (0.8 acres; 3,250 m2) are a display management area; and 11,000 ft2 (0.25 acres; 1,020 m2) are an education area.

Visitors can walk along a trail on the floor of the jungle, as well as on a walkway around and above the animals. As of spring 2022, the ground trail has been closed since 2020 due to the COVID-19 pandemic. Both levels are split into sections by continent, including Asia, Africa, and South America.

Along both trails, about 90 species can be found, including:
 Black howler
 Blue monkey
 Colombian spider monkey
 Common squirrel monkey
 De Brazza's monkey
 Red-backed bearded saki
 Pygmy hippopotamus
 Wolf's mona monkey
 Blue-and-yellow macaw
 Scarlet macaw
 Luzon bleeding-heart
 Nicobar pigeon
 Pied imperial pigeon
 African pygmy goose
 Hamerkop
 Javan pond heron
 Sunbittern
 Lowland paca
 Malayan tapir
 Indian crested porcupine
 Müller's gibbon
 White-handed gibbon
 Asian small-clawed otter
 Spotted-necked otter
 White-faced whistling duck
 Indian flying fox
 Blood python
 Yellow anaconda
 Arapaima
 Electric eel
 Ocellate river stingray
 Mekong giant catfish
 Pacu
 Piranha
 Giant Gourami
 Amazon catfish
Ring-tailed lemurs, red ruffed lemurs, and black-and-white ruffed lemurs used to be on display in the Lied Jungle, but were moved to the Expedition Madagascar exhibit upon its opening in 2010.

Notable points
Visitors to the jungle can view the indoor jungle through  of floor-to-ceiling windows at the Durham's TreeTops Restaurant, which is next to the jungle. A portion of the electrical power needed for the jungle is provided by natural gas fuel cells. The jungle has won several awards, including "Single best zoo exhibit in the country" in 1994 by the Family Life Magazine; "Significant Achievement Award for Exhibit Design" in 1993 by the American Association of Zoological Parks and Aquariums; "Top ten designs in the world" in 1992 by Time, and "Top eight US engineering accomplishments" in 1992 by the National Society of Professional Engineers

Owen Sea Lion Shores
The Owen Sea Lion Shores opened on September 4, 2020, costing $27.5 million. The one-acre exhibit replaced the Durham Family Bear Canyon, and the smaller Owen Sea Lion Pavilion. It features a 275,000-gallon saltwater pool with natural wave chambers, shallow beaches for young pups learning to swim, fish feeders that release fish and calamari at random times and places in the exhibit encouraging hunting behavior, a shaded seating area with a capacity of up to 170, and an underwater viewing cavern.

The exhibit features two species: California sea lions and harbour seals.

Simmons Aviary
The Simmons Aviary opened in 1983, and is the world's third-largest free-flight aviary. It is home to about 500 birds from around the world. 
The use of nylon instead of wire is a unique concept to modern aviaries.

In this  exhibit, visitors see American flamingos, black crowned cranes, scarlet ibises, hadada ibises, northern bald ibises, straw-necked ibises, hamerkops, cattle egrets, snowy egrets, roseate spoonbills, Inca terns, ducks, black-necked swans and white storks.

The Wild Kingdom Pavilion
Situated inside the zoo's main entrance, the  Mutual of Omaha's Wild Kingdom Pavilion was completed in the spring of 1987. The building currently houses reptiles, insects, amphibians, and small mammals, while also providing business offices, a 312-seat multimedia auditorium, and classrooms.

The Wild Kingdom Pavilion has been partially transformed into the Exploration Station exhibit, serving as a safari-themed “Trail Head” where visitors begin their “wild” adventure at Omaha's zoo. Mutual of Omaha's Exploration Station includes a detailed interactive map of the zoo and video previews of major attractions, as well as information on the History of the Zoo. The center of the Pavilion features a -high netted tree, with free-flying birds. Below the tree includes water displays with turtles, archer fish, and more. The building's original public area, or living classroom, contains what is known as the Small Animal Collection. This area houses part of the zoo's reptile collection, as well as a large number of invertebrates. The animal collection represents the tremendous diversity in the animal kingdom, and includes tarantulas, turtles, snakes, hedgehogs, and other small animals.

African Penguins
In the zoo there is a pool that hosts a colony of african penguins and various species of Sudafrican fish.
Animals including:
 African Penguin

Budgie
There is even a colony of Budgie encounter in the Adventure Trails section.
Species:
 Budgie
 Cacatua

Stingray Beach
There is a pool where you can touch and admire some Stingray.

Peacock
In the zoo wonder free along the paths the Peacocks.

Other exhibits

The zoo also features Lozier theater, Glacier Bay Landing, Stingray Beach, and the a Budgie Encounter in the Adventure Trails section

Retired exhibits

Cat Complex

The Cat Complex opened in 1977 at a cost of $2.5 million. The complex had 11 indoor enclosures and 10 outdoor enclosures with a claimed capacity of up to 100 cats.
The building was the largest cat-breeding and management facility in North America.
The Cat Complex was awarded the "Edward H. Bean Award" (1994) for tiger husbandry by the Association of Zoos and Aquariums.
Omaha's Henry Doorly Zoo and Aquarium is known worldwide for its work in the field of artificial insemination of large cats. The zoo's 15-year master plan, composed in 2010, called for the elimination of the Cat Complex along with the overhauling of several other exhibits. Going forward, animals at the zoo are grouped not by their genetic relatives, but by regions of the world. The exhibit was closed permanently in 2019 and demolished in 2022 as the cats located in the Cat Complex were relocated to new exhibits in the African Grasslands and Asian Highlands, or at other zoos and sanctuaries.

The complex contained nine species from the family Felidae:
 Amur leopard (Panthera pardus orientalis)
 Cougar (Puma concolor)
 Fishing cat (Prionailurus viverrinus)
 Jaguar (Panthera onca)
 Snow leopard (Panthera uncia)
 African lion (Panthera leo)
 Bengal tiger (Panthera tigris tigris)
 Indochinese tiger (P. t. corbetti)
 Siberian tiger (P. t. altaica)

Durham Family Bear Canyon

The Durham Family Bear Canyon opened in 1989 at a cost of $1.4 million. The canyon had a large  tank for polar bears. Having previously housed four bear species - the Polar bear, the American black bear, the Sun bear and the Spectacled bear, it was closed and demolished in 2018 to make room for Owen Sea Lion Shores.

Red Barn Park
The Red Barn Park was a petting zoo that opened in 1966. It included numerous domesticated animals including goats and cattle and was particularly noteworthy because of the large red barn that could be found in the area. It was demolished in 2018 and replaced with the Glacier Bay Landing area which opened in the spring of 2019. Many of the animals found in the exhibit were transferred to the Children's Adventure Trails.

Conservation

Amphibian Conservation Area
The zoo's Amphibian Conservation Area opened following the 2005 release of the International Union for Conservation of Nature's Global Amphibian Assessment, as in-depth status report on the world's 8,000-plus known frogs, toads, salamanders, and caecilians, which declared amphibians as the most significantly threatened group of vertebrates in the world. The mission of the behind-the-scenes area, which is not accessible to visitors, is to address wild amphibian decline by continually advancing conservation efforts through evolving welfare, reproduction, collaboration, and reintroduction.

The 3,800 square-foot facility features 13 temperature-controlled rooms, a specialized wastewater treatment system, insect culturing area and thorough disinfection protocols to ensure the entire space remains pathogen-free. With only three full-time keepers, the Amphibian Conservation Area has supported the release of more than 121,000 amphibians to date.

Recovery Program Impact

Wyoming Toad
 Population status: Extinct in the wild with one population remaining in a few release sites in the Laramie Basin of Wyoming.
 Recovery program involvement: Active since 1992. The zoo maintains the studbook for the Wyoming Toad Species Survival Plan.
 Contribution to the species: 31,000-plus individuals released with releases planned annually

Western Boreal Toad
 Population status: Since 1994, the species has declined across much of the western United States, extending north to Alaska with a genetically distant and declining population at southern Utah's Paunsaugunt Plateau.
 Recovery program involvement: 1995 - Present
 Contribution to the species: 3,877 individuals released with releases planned annually

Eastern Hellbender
 Population status: North America's giant salamander is found across 15 states, including northeastern Mississippi, northern Alabama, northern Georgia, Tennessee, western North Carolina, western Virginia, West Virginia, Kentucky, eastern Illinois, southern Indiana, Ohio, Pennsylvania, western Maryland, and southern New York with a distinct declining population occurring in east-central Missouri.
 Recovery program involvement: 2012 - 2017
 Contribution to the species: 91 individuals released

Puerto Rican Crested Toads
 Population status: Critically endangered with only 1,000 - 3,000 remaining in the wild. It is the only toad native to Puerto Rico.
 Recovery program involvement: 1998 - Present
 Contribution to the species: 80,000-plus individuals released with releases planned annually

Mountain Yellow-Legged Frog
 Population status: Endangered with two distinct populations in southern California's Sierra Nevada Mountains
 Recovery program involvement: 2017 - Present
 Contribution to the species: 800-plus individuals released with releases planned annually

Dusky Gopher Frog
 Population status: The most critically endangered frog species in the United States and presently known to only survive in Mississippi's Harrison and Jackson Counties. At one point, possibly less than 75 adults remained in the wild.
 Recovery program involvement: 2008 - Present (Zoo has had animals since 2004.)
 Contribution to the species: 792 individuals released with releases planned annually

Amphibian Rescue and Translocation Program for Native Species
 Status: Ground-breaking construction projects, day-to-day exhibit maintenance, weather events and other unforeseen circumstances can put amphibians native to the area in harm's way. After discovering a population of American toads living on grounds, zoo staff routinely survey the entire property in search of these and other amphibian species, sometimes in the early stages of life, who need care or need to be relocated to a safer environment to thrive.
 Species involved: Include but not limited to: American toad, Woodhouse toad, the chorus frog, plains leopard frog, and eastern tiger salamander.
 Recovery program involvement: 2012 - Present 
 Contribution to the species: 3,480 individuals released

Research
The Bill and Berniece Grewcock Center for Conservation and Research is a world-class research center at the zoo. The center has discovered several new species. The world's first in vitro-fertilized ("test-tube") gorilla resides at the zoo. The world's first artificially inseminated tiger was born in Omaha in 1991, followed by the world's first artificially inseminated gaur. The original  facility was constructed in 1996.

The research center focuses on six areas:
 Education and technology transfer
 Conservation medicine
 Molecular genetics
 Reproductive physiology
 Horticulture
 Nutrition

Mouse lemurs
A study led by Edward Louis, a conservation geneticist at the zoo, identified three new mouse lemurs (Simmons' mouse lemur, Mittermeier's mouse lemur, and Jolly's mouse lemur) with the first named after Lee Simmons, the zoo's director.

Rides and transportation

Railroad

The railroad began operations on July 22, 1968, after the track was laid down by the Union Pacific railroad. The train operates with one of two oil-powered steam locomotives. Riva is about twice as powerful (although is almost 80 years older) as the #119 and is regularly used on weekends when more visitors are present. The #119 is the original locomotive for the zoo. A new diesel locomotive arrived in September 2008. This diesel is a 2-axle Plymouth locomotive and is used for switching operations of the passenger cars and other railroad-related projects.

Tram
The tram is a trackless tram that drives on the walkway paths around the zoo.
It has four stops:
 By the Desert Dome (top of the hill)
 Between the elephant/zebra yard and pygmy goat corral
 By the playground near the sea lions
 Between the carousel and Alaskan Adventure splashpad

Skyfari
Omaha's Henry Doorly Zoo and Aquarium opened the Skyfari in 2009. It is an aerial tram that runs from one stop at the Butterfly and Insect Pavilion to the lion platform. It goes over the African veldt (ostriches and giraffes), cheetahs, the railroad tracks, the Garden of the Senses, the koi lagoon, and the lions.

Carousel
A carousel is available on which visitors can ride handcrafted recreations of wild animals. In 2021, it was moved to the Glacier Bay area which, as of spring 2022, is closed undergoing extensive renovations.

Educational programs
The zoo offers many educational programs. The activities include school-involved programs, special "edzoocational" programs, zoo internships, animal-adoption, and volunteer work. Several programs include field trips, guided tours, educator workshops, Little Lion's Preschool, and two-way internet video conferencing to bring the zoo to the classroom. The edzoocational programs are educational programs that are taught in a nontraditional way. These programs include overnight camp-outs at the zoo, scouting programs, summer camps, birthday parties, and on-site speakers.

References

External links 

 
 The Essential Henry Doorly Zoo Guide and iPhone App
 Gorilla breaks window

Zoos in Nebraska
Organizations based in Omaha, Nebraska
Parks in Omaha, Nebraska
1894 establishments in Nebraska
Tourist attractions in Omaha, Nebraska
Aviaries in the United States
Insectariums
Aquaria in Nebraska
Buildings and structures in Omaha, Nebraska